Spur 588 is a state highway spur in Odessa, Texas. Spur 588 runs from its northern terminus at SH 191, along Faudree Rd. through the Country Club area to its southern terminus at Interstate 20 Business. Spur 588 was created on April 26, 1989.

Route description
Spur 588 begins at an intersection with I-20 Business in Odessa, Midland County, heading northwest on four-lane undivided Faudree Road. The road passes between the Odessa Country Club to the west and commercial areas to the east before running between the golf course and residential neighborhoods. The highway continues past more housing subdivisions with some fields, crossing into Ector County. Spur 588 reaches its northern terminus at an interchange with SH 191.

History
Spur 588 was created in 1989 to connect US 80 (now I-20 Business) to SH 191. It has remained on its current alignment since.

Future
The Midland/Odessa Transportation Organization, or MOTOR, has plans to extend Spur 588 from its current Northern Terminus at SH 191 northward to SH 158 near Gardendale, and to extend it southward from its southern terminus at Interstate 20 Business to a new interchange at I-20 still in Odessa.

Major intersections

References

588
Transportation in Midland County, Texas
Transportation in Ector County, Texas